Patrick Katalay (born 29 November 1977) is a Congolese former footballer.

Club career
Katalay began his career at AS Bantous in Zaire and joined DC Motema Pembe in 1997. He moved to China and signed a contract with Chinese Jia-A League club Chongqing Longxin in 1999. Katalay just scored one goal in the Chinese FA Cup against Guangzhou Baiyunshan and didn't score a goal in the first nine league matches. He was released by Chongqing in May. He joined Chinese Jia-B League club Guangzhou Baiyunshan several days later. Although Guangzhou Baiyunshan was relegated to China League Two in this season, Katalay did very well in the club. In January 2000, he transferred to another Jia-B League club in Guangzhou, Guangzhou Apollo. Katalay played two seasons in Guangzhou Apollo (later renamed as Guangzhou Geely), scoring 14 goals in 40 appearances.

Guangzhou Geely did not extend his contract at the end of the 2001 league season, Katalay returned to his home country and joined Saint Eloi Lupopo.

References

External links 
 

1977 births
Living people
Democratic Republic of the Congo footballers
Guangzhou F.C. players
Chongqing Liangjiang Athletic F.C. players
Expatriate footballers in China
Expatriate footballers in Hong Kong
Expatriate footballers in Gabon
Expatriate footballers in Tanzania
Moro United F.C. players
Association football forwards
Democratic Republic of the Congo international footballers
Tanzanian Premier League players